The 2016–17 CEV Cup was the 45th edition of the European CEV Cup volleyball club tournament.

French club Tours VB beat multi-titled Italian Trentino Diatec in finals. Czech opposite David Konečný, playing for the winning team, was titled Most Valuable Player.

Participating teams
The number of participants on the basis of ranking list for European Cup Competitions:

Main phase

32nd Finals

|}

First leg

|}

Second leg

|}

16th Finals
The 16 winning teams from the Round of 32 will compete in the Eighthfinals playing home & away matches.

|}

First leg

|}

Second leg

|}

8th Finals
The 8 winning teams from the eighthfinals will compete in the quarterfinals playing home & away matches.

|}

First leg

|}

Second leg

|}

4th Finals

|}

First leg

|}

Second leg

|}

Final phase

Semi finals

|}

First leg

|}

Second leg

|}

Final

First leg

|}

Second leg

|}

Final standing

References

External links
 Official website

CEV Cup
2016 in volleyball
2017 in men's volleyball